Strehovci is a village in the Municipality of Dobrovnik in the Prekmurje region of Slovenia.

A chapel is built in the hills to the north of the main settlement and is dedicated to Saint Vitus. It belongs to the Parish of Bogojina.

References

External links

Strehovci on Geopedia

Populated places in the Municipality of Dobrovnik